

The Freiberger Ron's 1 is an American two-seat homebuilt aerobatic monoplane designed and built by Ronald D. Freiberger, it was highly modified aerobatic variant of the Spezio Tuholer.

Design and development
Freiberger, a design engineer at General Motors and Rose-Hulman graduate flew Ron's 1 in November 1971, it was a braced low-wing monoplane with a welded steel-tube fuselage covered with Ceconite. The two-spar wing had vee-bracing struts and was made of wood with a Ceconite covering. Ron's 1 had a fixed tailwheel type landing gear with fairings over the main wheels, the pilot and passenger sat in tandem open cockpits. Powered by a  Lycoming O-320-B1B flat-four air-cooled engine driving a two-bladed metal fixed pitch propeller, Freiberger enclosed the engine in a radial-style cowling to give the aircraft a look of the early 1930s racing aircraft.

Specifications

References

Notes

Bibliography

1970s United States sport aircraft
Homebuilt aircraft
Aircraft manufactured in the United States
Single-engined tractor aircraft
Aerobatic aircraft
Aircraft first flown in 1971